This is a list of college football coaches with 20 ties.  College football coaches who have coached college teams to 20 or more tie games are included in the list.  College football has since established tiebreaking rules—the last tie game at the top level of college football occurred on November 25, 1995, between Wisconsin and Illinois. Without a change in game rules, no new members will be added to this list, and there are no active efforts to repeal tiebreaking rules.

"College level" is defined as a four-year college or university program in either the National Association of Intercollegiate Athletics or the National Collegiate Athletic Association. If the team competed at a time before the official organization of either of the two groups but is generally accepted as a "college football program" it would also be included.

Summary
This section considers only coaches who appear on the list.

Tenure
The coach with the longest tenure is Amos Alonzo Stagg, who coached for 55 seasons and 555 games. Coach Stagg and Glenn "Pop" Warner are the only two entrants who began coaching before 1900, while no entrant was active after the 1954 season. Butch Cowell had the shortest tenure, at 21 years. Cowell and Howard Hancock had the fewest games coached, at 180 each.

Percentages
Howard Jones registered the highest winning percentage, at 73.3%, while Frank Dobson has the lowest winning percentage, at 49.6%, the only coach below 50%. Coach Hancock recorded the highest percentage of tie games, at 14.4%. A total of five coaches produced at least one tie game out of every ten games played (10%).  Coach Stagg had the lowest percentage of tie games, at 6.3%.

College football coaches with 20 (or more) career ties

Notes

See also
 List of college football coaches with 200 wins
 List of college football coaches with 100 losses
 List of college football coaches with 0 career wins
 List of college football coaches with 30 seasons
 List of college football coaches with a .750 winning percentage

References

20 career ties